Gerald Crough (born 27 December 1937) is  a former Australian rules footballer who played with South Melbourne in the Victorian Football League (VFL).

Notes

External links 
		

Living people
1937 births
Australian rules footballers from Victoria (Australia)
Sydney Swans players